9600 may refer to:
 The year 9600, in the 10th millennium.
 ATI Radeon 9600, a computer graphics card series
 NVIDIA GeForce 9600, a computer graphics card series
 Windows 8.1 build 9600, an operating system.